Terminus Dam is a dam on the Kaweah River in Tulare County, California in the United States, located near Three Rivers about  from the western boundary of Sequoia National Park and  east of Visalia. The dam forms Lake Kaweah for flood control and irrigation water supply.

History
Terminus Dam is one of four dams built on the rivers of the Tulare Lake basin, located at the southern end of the San Joaquin Valley. In the 1920s, the USACE and the State of California first surveyed the area for suitable reservoir sites to provide irrigation water. After devastating floods in the late 1930s, the Flood Control Act of 1944 authorized the USACE to build Terminus Dam as part of a system to provide flood protection for the Tulare basin.

In 1948, with plans for the dam on the Kaweah River nearly complete, an archaeological survey of the future reservoir site revealed an unusually rich selection of Native American artifacts. Many of these were removed by the U.S. National Park Service's Interagency Archaeological Salvage Program before the beginning of work on the dam.

Construction of Terminus Dam started in the late 1950s and was completed in 1962. The dam was dedicated along with the Success Dam, further south on the Tule River, on May 18, 1962. Sedimentation had reduced this to  according to a study conducted in 1977.

Together with the three other major dams in the Tulare basin, Terminus Dam contributed to the desiccation of Tulare Lake, once one of the largest wetland regions in the United States.

Spillway expansion

In the 1990s the USACE began studies for a project to increase the capacity of the dam's spillway, which was considered inadequate to pass the probable maximum flood on the Kaweah River. The fusegates, invented and patented by François Lempérière for Hydroplus, subsidiary of GTM Entrepose, are the largest in the world, and are designed to open automatically by water pressure when Lake Kaweah reaches dangerously high levels. The design was chosen because it would provide cost savings over conventional options such as a concrete or gated spillway.

The dam is now capable of completely controlling a 70-year flood, as compared to a 46-year flood before the fusegates were installed.

Functions

As a dry dam, Terminus Dam's primary purpose is flood control; consequently, the reservoir is usually maintained at a very low level, except in late spring and early summer when it is used to store snowmelt runoff from the Sierra Nevada. Shortly after its completion, the dam and reservoir were put to the test by record floods in December 1966, during which Terminus, Success and Isabella Dams prevented a collective $81.9 million of damages. Between 1962 and 2012, Terminus Dam has prevented $373,225,000 of flood-related damages.

Water releases from Terminus Dam are made based on agricultural demand when flood control releases are not required. Snowmelt runoff stored in Lake Kaweah are released at high rates between May and late July-early August during the peak of the irrigation season. The water serves multiple local water districts such as the Tulare Irrigation District (TID) and Kaweah Delta Water Conservation District (KDWCD), as well as urban areas including Visalia and Tulare. The dam also generates hydroelectricity from a plant built in 1992 by the Kaweah River Power Authority (KRPA), which is jointly managed by TID and KDWCD. Electricity generated here is distributed by Southern California Edison. The power plant currently has a capacity of 20.09 megawatts (MW), upgraded from its original capacity of 17 MW, and generates roughly 40 million kilowatt hours (KWh) per year. The KRPA planned to expand this capacity by a further 9 MW, which would allow for the generation of an additional 9.2 million KWh, but construction has not yet started . In February 2020, the KRPA filed to transfer their operating license to Eagle Creek Renewable Energy, the US subsidiary of Ontario Power Generation.

See also
Central Valley Project
List of dams and reservoirs in California

References

Works cited

External links

U.S. Army Corps of Engineers - Lake Kaweah
Daily data for Terminus Dam and Lake Kaweah - California Department of Water Resources

Terminus
Buildings and structures in Tulare County, California
United States Army Corps of Engineers dams
Dams completed in 1962
Earth-filled dams
Dams in the Tulare Basin